First Lutheran Church and School (FLCS) is a member of the Lutheran Church–Missouri Synod  located at 1810 Northampton St. in Holyoke, Massachusetts. The school is a Christian-based Pre-K to 8th grade school with around 100 students.

Pastor
Rev. Randall T Bessette was born on March 27, 1961, in Ware, Massachusetts. He attended local Holyoke schools and graduated from Holyoke High School in 1979. He attended Holyoke Community College to fulfill the requirements to enter Concordia Theological Seminary. In May 2001 he and his wife Bonnie left for Fort Wayne, Indiana. In June 2001 he started his seminary education with summer Greek. He graduated from Concordia Theological Seminary on May 20, 2005, with a Master of Divinity.

In April 2005, he received his first call to be the pastor of Our Savior Lutheran Church in Mashpee, Massachusetts. He was ordained on June 12, 2005, at First Lutheran Church in Holyoke, Massachusetts. Bessette was then installed at Our Savior on July 10, 2005, where he served faithfully for four years. Bessette received a Call to be the Pastor of First Lutheran on June 23, 2009, and accepted the call on July 12, 2009.

Principal
Marianne Bischoff is the current principal of First Lutheran School. She has served callings for help at different churches around the world. She has worked in the Philippines, California, Ohio, and New England. Marianne has been the principal at First Lutheran School for over 7 years.

School history
First Lutheran Church and School originated in 1867, but the school did not start for more than 100 years after that. The school was formally founded in 1983. The school half of the building was originally added for summer school, but then turned into a full service school.

References

Private elementary schools in Massachusetts
Private middle schools in Massachusetts
Lutheran Church–Missouri Synod churches